Pesteh Beyglu (also Romanized as Pesteh Beyglū; also known as Pasteh Beyg and Pesteh Beyk) is a village in Owch Hacha Rural District, in the Central District of Ahar County, East Azerbaijan Province, Iran. At the 2006 census, its population was 208, in 48 families.

References 

Populated places in Ahar County